Sarabjit Singh Sehmi (born 19 April 1963) is a Kenyan field hockey player. He competed in the men's tournament at the 1984 Summer Olympics.

References

External links
 

1963 births
Living people
Kenyan male field hockey players
Olympic field hockey players of Kenya
Field hockey players at the 1984 Summer Olympics
Place of birth missing (living people)
Kenyan people of Indian descent
Kenyan people of Punjabi descent